Grisart is a French surname. Notable people with the surname include:

 Charles Grisart (1837–1904), French composer
 Jean-Louis Victor Grisart (1797–1877), French architect

French-language surnames